Fort Coenraadsburg or Conraadsburg, also Fort São Tiago da Mina, is a small Portuguese chapel built in honor of Saint Jago and it is situated opposite the Elmina Castle in the Central region of Ghana, to protect Fort Elmina from attacks. Owing to its historical importance and testimony to the Atlantic slave trade, Fort Conraadsburg was inscribed on the UNESCO World Heritage List in 1979 along with several other castles in Ghana.

History
Fort Conraadsburg was built in the 1660s. It was built on the site of a fortified chapel that the Portuguese had built and that the Dutch had burned to the ground in the Battle of Elmina (1637). The Dutch ceded the fort to Britain in 1872, together with the entire Dutch Gold Coast. Before the fort was built, the Dutch used the hill as a gun-position to bombard the Portuguese in the year 1637. To prevent others from doing the same tactic against the Portuguese, the Dutch constructed a fortified earthwork the following year

Features 
In the 1660s, the then Elmina Castle Director General J. Valckenburgh changed the earthen fortification with a permanent fort made up of local sandstone and named it Coenraadsburg. The fort was built mainly for military purposes so it had no commercial warehouses. The fort was well-garrisoned so the Dutch used it as a prison for European convicts and also as a disciplinary institution for their officers who are disobedient to their laws.

Ever since the fort was transferred from the Dutch to the British, they modified the fort for the easy use of it for civilian pursuit.  In recent years, the fort has been used as a prison, a hospital and a rest house. The fort currently in a good condition, is used as an inn and a restaurant. The fort opening hours are 9:00am to 4:30pm.

Gallery

References

External links
 3D model, of Fort Saint Jago

Buildings and structures completed in 1652
History of Ghana
Castles in Ghana
Dutch Gold Coast
Elmina
1652 establishments in Africa
1652 establishments in the Dutch Empire
Coenraadsburg